Secureworks Inc. is an American cybersecurity company. The company has approximately 4,000 customers in more than 50 countries, ranging from Fortune 100 companies to mid-sized businesses in a variety of industries.

It became part of Dell Technologies in February 2011 and was later the subject of an IPO to again become a publicly traded company in April 2016. It is still majority-owned by Dell.

History
Secureworks was founded as a privately held company in 1998 by Michael Pearson and Joan Wilbanks. In 2002, Michael R. Cote became President and CEO. In 2005, and again in 2006, the company was named to the Inc. 500 and Inc. 5000 lists 2006 and Deloitte’s Fast 500.

In 2006, Secureworks merged with LURHQ Corporation and the new entity continued under the Secureworks corporate name. LURHQ was founded in 1996 in Myrtle Beach, SC and provided managed security services to large enterprises. With the merger, Secureworks was able to leverage Sherlock, LURHQ's portal, to unify its combined customer base onto a single integrated security management platform.

In 2009, Secureworks acquired the Managed Security Services (MSS) business from VeriSign, Inc., and grew to more than 500 employees worldwide. The acquisition expanded its clients to approximately 2,600 in more than 50 countries, including the United Kingdom, Saudi Arabia, Taiwan, Finland, Spain, Brazil and Mexico. This includes four of the Fortune 10. 

In December 2009, Secureworks acquired managed security and consulting firm dns Limited. This acquisition expanded Secureworks' operation to include a UK-based operations center and additional offices in London and Edinburgh.

On January 4, 2011, Dell announced that it would acquire Secureworks to be part of Dell Services. Dell Secureworks officially began operating as a Dell subsidiary on February 7, 2011.

Dell Secureworks expanded into Australia and New Zealand region in 2013. Dell Secureworks opened an operations center in Sydney to meet demands from local Australia businesses, the most in demand services in this area being Penetration Testing, forensic investigations and ongoing monitoring of environments for attacks.

On December 17, 2015, Secureworks filed to go public. Subsequently, on April 22, 2016, announced its IPO, raising $112 million after pricing its IPO at $14 per share. However, the company was expecting the initial price to be between $15.50-$17.50. This was the first tech IPO in the U.S. in 2016. In August 2017, Secureworks rebranded its logo and changed capitalization of the 'W' in its name to lower case.

In an evolution of its long standing business of selling Managed Security Services (MSSP), in April 2019, Secureworks announced the availability of Red Cloak Threat Detection and Response a cloud based, SaaS next-generation SIEM product designed to analyse, detect, investigate and respond to malicious threats across an organizations endpoints, network and cloud environment.  As of June 2020, the company reported 40% Annual Recurring Revenue growth from its SaaS solution.

Along with 20 other cyber security software providers, Secureworks took part in the MITRE ATT&CK Endpoint Protection Product Evaluation. MITRE ATT&CK® is a globally-accessible knowledge base of adversary tactics and techniques based on real-world observations. The ATT&CK knowledge base is used as a foundation for the development of specific threat models and methodologies in the private sector, in government, and in the cybersecurity product and service community. Secureworks Red Cloak Threat Detection and Response was 100% successful at detecting activity for the Persistence, Privilege Escalation, Discovery and Lateral Movement tactics and techniques, which underscores Secureworks’ ability to detect attacks early in the kill chain. Red Cloak TDR had telemetry visibility across the MITRE ATT&CK Framework and was able to capture attacker activity during each step of the evaluation, as well as provide visibility or generated detections across 90% of technique categories used in the evaluation

May 21, 2020 Secureworks signaled a shift away from a primarily direct go to market model to a channel focused business model with the announcement of the Secureworks Global Partner Program, designed to attract and reward resellers and referral partners who sell Secureworks software.

On September 3, 2021, Wendy K. Thomas became President and CEO of Secureworks following the retirement of Michael R. Cote.

Accolades 

 "Leader" in Gartner Magic Quadrant for Managed Security Services, Worldwide (May 2019)
 "Large vendor" Forrester  Now Tech: Managed Detection And Response (MDR) Services (2018)
 Leader in the IDC MarketScape for Managed Security Services 2020 Vendor Assessment (September 2020)

Counter Threat Unit 
The Secureworks Counter Threat Unit (CTU) monitors, tracks, and analyzes threat vulnerabilities of its global client base.

In May 2020, the Secureworks Counter Threat Unit (CTU) research team began publishing Threat Group profiles on the Secureworks website. Threat Groups are "intrusion sets" or "clusters of observed activity"; that exist in cyberspace; attempt to cause harm to organizations or businesses. 

The published Threat Group profiles include a summary of the groups, their objectives, other aliases by which the groups are known, and the malware they use. Both criminal and government-sponsored Threat Groups are included.

References 

Computer companies of the United States
Computer security companies
Companies acquired by Dell
Computer companies established in 1998
2016 initial public offerings
2011 mergers and acquisitions
Companies based in Atlanta
Companies listed on the Nasdaq